Adam Vincent Graessle (born November 25, 1984) is a former American football punter. He was signed by the Green Bay Packers as an undrafted free agent in 2009. He played college football at Pittsburgh.

Graessle was also a member of the California Redwoods and Pittsburgh Steelers.

College career
Graessle was rated the nation's No. 23 placekicker by Rivals.com coming out of high school. He was recruited by the University of Pittsburgh, where he was an All-Big East selection as a sophomore and was a Ray Guy Award candidate.

Professional career

Green Bay Packers
Graessle was signed as an undrafted free agent after the 2009 NFL Draft by the Green Bay Packers. He was released prior to the start of the 2009 season.

Pittsburgh Steelers
Graessle signed a future contract with the Pittsburgh Steelers on February 9, 2010. He was waived on June 15.

1984 births
Living people
Players of American football from Ohio
American football punters
Pittsburgh Panthers football players
Sacramento Mountain Lions players
Pittsburgh Steelers players
People from Dublin, Ohio
Green Bay Packers players